Satellogic is a company specializing in Earth-observation satellites, founded in 2010 by Emiliano Kargieman and Gerardo Richarte.

Satellogic began launching their Aleph-1 constellation of ÑuSat satellites in May 2016.

On 19 December 2019, Satellogic announced they have received US$50 million in funding in the latest funding round. In January 2022 the company went public with a special-purpose acquisition company (CF Acquisition Corp. V) merger. Satellogic is a publicly traded company on the Nasdaq exchange.

History 
In the summer of 2010, after spending some time at the Ames Research Center in Mountain View, California, Emiliano Kargieman started developing the concepts that would become Satellogic. He realized there was a great opportunity: to bring to the satellite services industry many of the lessons learned during the last two decades of working with Information Technology, and build a platform that provides spatial information services, without major investments in infrastructure. Together with his friend and colleague, Gerardo Richarte, they started Satellogic.

Since 2010, the company has grown from a small start-up to a multinational company that has customers around the globe.

Satellogic made Argentina's first two nanosatelites, CubeBug-1 (nickname El Capitán Beto, COSPAR 2013-018D, launched 26 April 2013 on a Long March 2D launch vehicle) and CubeBug-2 (nickname Manolito, also known as LUSAT-OSCAR 74 or LO 74, COSPAR 2013-066AA, launched 21 November 2013 on a Dnepr launch vehicle). Their third satellite, BugSat 1 (nickname Tita), launched in June 2014. Both the CubeBug-1 and CubeBug-2 as well as the BugSat 1 satellite served as technology tests and demonstrations for the ÑuSat satellites. They also had amateur radio payloads.

The CubeBug project was sponsored by Argentinian Ministry of Science, Technology and Productive Innovation. Satellogic began launching their Aleph-1 constellation of ÑuSat satellites in May 2016.

On 19 December 2019, Satellogic announced they have received US$50 million in funding in the latest funding round. In January 2022 the company went public with a special-purpose acquisition company (CF Acquisition Corp. V) merger. In connection with the closing of the business combination and other transactions, Satellogic received gross proceeds of approximately $262 million to fund its satellite constellation. Satellogic planned to have 202 satellites in orbit by 2025 and expected revenue of $480 million in 2025.

On 2 January 2023, Satellogic had 26 satelllites in operation in space and staff of about 380 people. Its revenues for all of 2022 were $6-8 million.

Technology 
Satellogic is building a 200+ satellite constellation as a scalable Earth observation platform with the ability to weekly remap the entire planet at high resolution to provide affordable geospatial insights for daily decision making.

Satellogic created a small, light, and inexpensive system that can be produced at scale. Each commercial satellite carries two payloads – one for high resolution multispectral imaging and another one for a hyperspectral camera of 30 m GSD and 150 km swath (at a 470 km altitude).

Satellite specifications 
Satellogic's satellites are built to the following specifications:

Products and services

Dedicated satellite constellations 
Satellogic's markets "Dedicated Satellite Constellations" (DSC) as an opportunity for customers to develop a national geospatial imaging program at unmatched frequency, resolution and cost. This program is aimed at municipal, state and national governments eager to gain exclusive control of a fleet of satellites over an area of interest. It can be used to support key decisions, to manage policy impact, to measure investment and socio-economic progress and to serve as an open environment to foster collaboration, data and information sharing.

DSC's satellites are registered and flagged by the operating entity. With complete control of the satellites over the designated area of interest, the operator will directly task the satellite from its own ground station, allowing frequent remapping and the ability to revisit specific points of interest several times per day. Total control of imagery download and private cloud archiving guarantee prompt and secure data management by an operator's own team.

In 2019. Satellogic signed its first agreement to deliver a dedicated satellite constellation for exclusive geospatial analytics in Henan Province, China.

DSC has been nominated for Via Satellite's "2019 Satellite Technology of the Year" Award.

Data services 
Satellogic offers 1-meter resolution multispectral imaging and 30-meter resolution hyperspectral satellite imagery.

Geospatial analytics 

Satellogic's data science and AI team convert images into layers  available as data-services in its online platform, including object identification, classification, semantic change detection and predictive models within a broad range of industries including agriculture, forestry, energy, finance and insurance, as well as applications for the civilian area of governments, such as cartography, environmental monitoring and critical infrastructure, among others.

Offices 
Satellogic's R&D facilities are located in Buenos Aires and Córdoba, Argentina. The AIT facility is located in Montevideo, Uruguay. The data-technology center in Barcelona, Spain; a product-development center in Tel Aviv, Israel; a finance office in Charlotte, United States, and there is a business development center in Miami, United States.

Satellite launches 
, Satellogic has launched 38 satellites  from the US (with SpaceX), China and Russia and French Guiana.

While the first three spacecraft were early prototypes, the following 31 satellites corresponded to four consecutive iterations and incremental versions of Satellogic's ÑuSat design (Mark I to Mark V).

Since 2018, Satellogic has a tradition of naming their spacecraft after important women scientists.

On 19 January 2021, it was announced that SpaceX would become their preferred rideshare vendor, the first due in June 2021. In May 2022, a new multi-launch agreement with SpaceX for the next ~60 satellites was announced.

See also 

 ÑuSat

References 

Commercial spaceflight
Companies listed on the Nasdaq
Special-purpose acquisition companies
Technology companies established in 2010
Remote sensing companies
Geospatial intelligence
Satellites
Earth observation satellites
Earth observation projects
Earth observation
Satellites in geosynchronous orbit
Nanosatellites
Satellite constellations
Imaging reconnaissance satellites
Prototypes
SpaceX
Spaceflight